FpML (Financial products Markup Language) is a business information exchange standard based on Extensible Markup Language (XML) that enables business-to-business over-the-counter (OTC) financial derivative transactions online by following W3C standards.

The standard is managed by International Swaps and Derivatives Association (ISDA) on behalf of a community of investment banks that make up the OTC derivatives industry. All categories of privately negotiated derivatives will eventually be included within the standard.

FpML is distinct from similar financial standards such as  SWIFT and FIX in scope because it provides no network or specification of a transport mechanism.

History
The FpML standard was first published by JPMorgan and PricewaterhouseCoopers on 9 June 1999 in a paper titled "Introducing FpML: A New Standard for E-commerce". As a result, the FpML standards committee was founded.

As of December 2021, FpML 5.12 is the latest recommended version. The core scope includes the products of Foreign Exchange (FX) Swaps and Options, Interest Rate Swaps, Inflation Swaps, Asset Swaps, Swaptions, Credit Default Swaps, Credit Default Swap Indices, Credit Default Swap Baskets, Tranches on Credit Default Swap Indices, Equity Options, Equity Swaps, Total Return Swaps, and many others. The core processes include trading, valuation, confirmation, novations, increases, amendments, terminations, allocations, position reporting, cash flow matching, a formal definition of party roles, as well as trade notification between asset managers and custodians.

Major participants

Bank of America
Barclays Capital
Barclays Global Investors
BNP Paribas
Bloomberg
Citibank
HSBC Bank USA
Creditex
Credit Suisse
Deutsche Bank
DTCC

FIS
Global Electronic Markets LLC
Goldman Sachs
IBM
ING
IONA Technologies
JPMorgan Chase
Nomura Securities Co.
Morgan Stanley
RBS

Rabobank
Standard Bank
Markit Group (since acquisition of SwapsWire)
Systemwire
TradeHeader
TZero
UBS
University College London
Wall Street Systems

See also
 Financial Information eXchange
 MDDL, a competing Market Data Definition Language

Resources

External links
 FpML Homepage
 ISDA Homepage

Markup languages
Market data
Financial industry XML-based standards
Financial software